Constantin Gangioveanu (born 4 September 1989) is a Romanian former football midfielder. He ended his career at age 27 after in 2016 he played in the United States for F.A. Euro New York. Afterwards he moved to Los Angeles where he worked various jobs, including as a fitness instructor.

Honours
Universitatea Craiova
Liga II: 2005–06

References

External links
 
 

1989 births
Living people
Romanian footballers
Romania under-21 international footballers
Romanian expatriate footballers
Liga I players
Liga II players
FC U Craiova 1948 players
FC Vaslui players
FC Rapid București players
F.A. Euro players
Association football midfielders
USL League Two players
Expatriate soccer players in the United States
Romanian expatriate sportspeople in the United States
Sportspeople from Craiova